Balaenophilidae is a family of copepods belonging to the order Harpacticoida.

Genera:
 Balaenophilus Aurivillius, 1879

References

Copepods